Kaçanik Gorge (Kačanička klisura) is a gorge located in southern Kosovo, stretching between the town of Kaçanik and the Macedonian border, with the Lepenac river running through it. The Gorge splits the Šar Mountain range (Sharr) from the Skopska Crna Gora Mountain range (Karadak). During Ottoman rule, the gorge saw fierce fighting, and inspired songs still used today.

Ravine
The ravine of Kaçanik, known as the "Drill" refers to a perforated stone which sits at the entrance of the gorge. It was historically called "Marko's Stone", named after the Serbian prince Marko, who tradition holds as having fought Musa Kesedžija at this place. A street traverses the gorge that comes from a short tunnel, which was removed after the Kosovo War. The tunnel was 15 meters long, about three meters wide and 2.5 meters high. At the entrance to the tunnel was a plaque that displayed the year of construction (1794) and the name of the Ottoman Pasha.

References 

Canyons and gorges of Kosovo
Canyons and gorges of Serbia